Etiopia (Serbian Cyrillic: Етиопиа) was a Serbian and former Yugoslav punk rock and Hardcore punk band from Jagodina.

Band history

Bend Etiopia was created in 1984, and was the founder Saša Milojević Saraga. That year he recorded the first demo Stale bread, six songs from the first, the original line-up: Sale Saraga – bass, Goran Pradegan – vocals, Dejan Radovanović – guitar and Dona – drums.

The second demo with 4 songs recorded in 1987 in the modified composition: Sale Saraga – bass, Nebojša Pantić Panta – drums, Dejan Arsić Arsa – guitar and Alexander Gajin Alez as a singer. The band played a number of concerts, mostly in Jagodina, but also in Kragujevac, Belgrade and Zagreb.

After the gig in Kragujevac, the band participates on a compilation tape In Yugoslavia, all is well in which she found herself with the same song name.

Commercial period 

In late 1989, the band leaving Panta and Arsa so Sale gathers new, third lineup: Sale Saraga – bass, Miško Cvetković Mikrofonija – guitar, Dušan Jevđović – drums and Dejan Đorđević – vocals.

The style of the band from the fierce changes in pop rock, and already in mid-1990, issued by the board of Zagreb Jugoton. He says the first spot Born in the suburbs, The band has manager (Ivan Plavšić) and frequent appearances on TV. During 1992. the band entered into a contract with Jugodisk on the issuance of the second LP. The material was recorded in addition to the regular force on the set is engaged Tanja Jovićević (ex. October 1864) for background vocals.

Due to disagreements with the manager, the band before the release of the second LP stops working.

From then until 2009, the band was not active.

A new beginning 

The band reunited in April 2009 in the composition of Sale Saraga (bass), Marko Stojanović (guitar), Ivan Aranđelović Chibi (drums) and Stevan Popović Beka (voice).

The band begins to play punk rock, and in a short time has a series of concerts in Serbia, most notably in Belgrade 20 October 2009. in the small hall of SKC as a guest of the British punk pioneer, The Vibrators.

During 2010, continues with concerts during which exits the CD "Live 2010 ..... No chance for better" for the Croatian publishing house Slušaj najglasnije.

In 2012, a collaboration with the Ukrainian punk rock band Ahineya and recorded a CD together.

In December 2014, performance in Talir Club in Jagodina, celebrated the 30th anniversary of the founding of the band, where they appeared on the scene and their former members.

The current line-up of the 2014.: 
 Sasa Milojević Saraga – bass guitar, 
 Nemanja Vićić Goldi – vocals, 
 Nebojša Pantić Panta – drums.

Discography

 Stale bread, the first demo (6 songs) in 1984. 
 Demo recordings (4 songs) in 1987. 
 Live Faculty of Economics, Kragujevac – Demo 6 May 1989. 
 Ethiopia LP (PGP RTB – self-released) 1990. 
 Live in Belgrade, SKC, Livingrum CD (studio Krofna – self-published), 2009. 
 No Name (Live in studio) Unrealized, 2010. 
 Live 2010 ... There is no chance for a better, CD (Slušaj najglasnije- Croatia), 2010. 
 Ethiopia & Ahineya (Split CD) 2012.

References

External links
 Ethiopia on Diskogs
 Ethiopia on Facebook
 MySpace page
 VK page

Musical groups established in 1984
Serbian punk rock groups
Yugoslav punk rock groups